Christian Park School No. 82 is a historic school building located at Indianapolis, Indiana.  It was built in 1931, and is a two-story, rectangular, Colonial Revival style brick building with a two-story addition built in 1955. It has a gable roof with paired end chimneys, balustrade, and an octagonal cupola.

It was listed on the National Register of Historic Places in 1995.

References

School buildings on the National Register of Historic Places in Indiana
Colonial Revival architecture in Indiana
School buildings completed in 1931
Schools in Indianapolis
National Register of Historic Places in Indianapolis